Potnyctycia; a genus of moths of the family Noctuidae.

Species
 Potnyctycia porphyrea Hreblay & Ronkay, 1998

References
Natural History Museum Lepidoptera genus database
Potnyctycia at funet

Xyleninae